Sam Chai is a district (amphoe) in the northern part of Kalasin province, northeastern Thailand.

Geography
Neighboring districts are (from the east clockwise): Kham Muang, Sahatsakhan, and Nong Kung Si of Kalasin Province and Wang Sam Mo of Udon Thani province.

History
The minor district (king amphoe) was created on 1 April 1995, when it was split off from Kham Muang district.

On 15 May 2007, all 81 minor districts were upgraded to full districts. With publication in the Royal Gazette on 24 August, the upgrade became official.

Administration
The district is divided into four sub-districts (tambons), which are further subdivided into 46 villages (mubans). There are no municipal (thesaban) areas, and four tambon administrative organizations (TAO).

References

External links
amphoe.com

Sam Chai